Alages may refer to:
Aragats, Talin, town in Armenia
Dar-Alages, volcano in Armenia